Sissano Lagoon is a lagoon located in West Aitape Rural LLG, Sandaun Province, Papua New Guinea.

The Piore River languages (also called the Lagoon languages), as well as the Sissano language, are spoken on the shores of the lagoon.

History 
The lagoon was heavily affected by a tsunami in 1998.

References 

Lagoons of Papua New Guinea
Sandaun Province